Ye-U is a town in the Ye-U District of the Sagaing Division in Myanmar.

References

Populated places in Sagaing Region
Township capitals of Myanmar